Yannick Kakoko (born 26 January 1990) is a German former professional footballer who played as a midfielder.

Career
Born in Saarbrücken, Kakoko began his career with ESV Saarbrücken and later 1. FC Saarbrücken. He left Saarbrücken in summer 2004, joining FC Metz, but returned to Germany after two years, joining Bayern Munich a youth contract. He made his debut in a 3. Liga match against VfR Aalen in March 2009, but had to be substituted due to injury. He left Bayern Munich II in July 2009 and signed his first professional contract with SpVgg Greuther Fürth. After one year in the Greuther Fürth reserve team, he signed a contract for VfR Aalen on 9 June 2010, but was released by the club six months later. He spent half a season playing for SV Wehen Wiesbaden II before joining SV Waldhof Mannheim in July 2011. A year later he signed for FC Homburg.

Kakoko joined Union Titus Pétange ahead of the 2019–20 season on a three-year contract.

He retired at the end of the 2020–21 season.

International career
Kakoko was member of the Germany U-17 at the 2007 FIFA U-17 World Cup in South Korea.

Personal life
Kakoko's father, Etepe, was also a footballer, representing Zaire (as the DR Congo was then known) at the 1974 World Cup. He also played for VfB Stuttgart, and later 1. FC Saarbrücken, whom Yannick represented as a youth.

Honours
Arka Gdynia
 Polish Cup: 2016–17
 Polish SuperCup: 2017

References

External links
 
 
 

1990 births
Living people
Sportspeople from Saarbrücken
German sportspeople of Democratic Republic of the Congo descent
German footballers
Association football forwards
2. Bundesliga players
3. Liga players
Ekstraklasa players
Luxembourg National Division players
FC Bayern Munich II players
SpVgg Greuther Fürth players
VfR Aalen players
SV Wehen Wiesbaden players
SV Waldhof Mannheim players
FC 08 Homburg players
Miedź Legnica players
Arka Gdynia players
F91 Dudelange players
Union Titus Pétange players
German expatriate footballers
German expatriate sportspeople in Poland
Expatriate footballers in Poland
German expatriate sportspeople in Luxembourg
Expatriate footballers in Luxembourg
Footballers from Saarland